Bridge Lake (historically known as Greater Fish Lake) is a lake in the Interlakes District of the South Cariboo region of the Interior of British Columbia, Canada.  It is the source of Bridge Creek which runs in a curving course west and then northeast to Canim Lake via the town of 100 Mile House.  The lake is approximately 16 km2 in area (including the area of several islands and rocks in the lake, the largest of which is named Long Island and is 1136 m in elevation.  It is located 560 km north of Vancouver and around 140 km northwest of Kamloops in the Interlakes District close to the Little Fort Highway (BC Highway 24).  It and its neighbours Sheridan Lake and Lac des Roches are the largest lakes along the Interlakes Highway.

The community of Bridge Lake (pop. 500) and Bridge Lake Centennial Provincial Park are located at the eastern end of the lake.  Just east of Bridge Lake is Lac des Roches while just west of it is Sheridan Lake; the three are the largest lakes in the district between Canim Lake to the north and Bonaparte lake to the southeast.  The basin of the Bonaparte River is just south of Bridge Lake, in the form of its tributary the Rayfield River.

See also
Bridge Creek

References
BCGNIS listing "Bridge Lake (lake)"

External links 
Bridge Lake

Lakes of the Cariboo
Lillooet Land District